Jake Ashley Cassidy (born 9 February 1993) is a Welsh professional footballer who plays as a forward for  club Guiseley. He made well over 100 appearances in the Football League playing for Wolverhampton Wanderers, Tranmere Rovers, Notts County, Southend United, Oldham Athletic and Stevenage. He has represented Wales at both under 19 and under 21 levels.

Club career
Cassidy joined Welsh Alliance club Llandudno Junction aged 16, where he made an immediate impact in his first season, scoring 28 times in 32 appearances in the 2009–10 season.

His debut season earned him a move to Welsh Premier League side Airbus UK Broughton in Summer 2010, and his impressive appearances for the club in a series of pre-season games saw him immediately depart for Wolverhampton Wanderers. He signed a two-year deal (with an option for a third) with the English Premier League side for an undisclosed fee following a short trial.

In March 2012, he moved on loan to League One side Tranmere Rovers, in a move later extended to run until the end of the season. He made his professional debut on 17 March 2012 in a 1–1 draw at Sheffield United, and scored in his second appearance, a 2–0 win at Rochdale. In total, he scored five times in ten appearances.

Ahead of the 2012–13 season the striker renewed returned for a second loan period with Tranmere Rovers; a move which lasted until January 2013. He scored his first goals of his return with a hat-trick against Colchester United in a 4–0 win on 1 September 2012 that put Tranmere top of the league. Cassidy was then named the League One Player of the Month for September 2012, after scoring seven league goals during the month. He returned to Wolves after his loan spell ended in January 2013 having scored 11 goals in 26 appearances.

Cassidy made his Wolves debut as a substitute in the club's FA Cup elimination at Luton Town on 5 January 2013, the final game of Ståle Solbakken's reign, before being selected to start Wolves' next league game by their new manager Dean Saunders. He made six league appearances as the club unsuccessfully fought to avoid relegation to League One.

At the start of the 2013–14 season, under new manager Kenny Jackett, Cassidy became a regular member of Wolves' matchday squads, starting several matches and appearing often as a substitute. However, he failed to score in any of these games.

In January 2014 joined Tranmere Rovers for a third loan spell, after a three-month deal was agreed. This loan spell, however, was less successful than his previous two as he scored just once in 19 appearances as the club struggled to avoid relegation.

After having signed a new one-year contract at Wolves (with an option for a further year), he was loaned to League One team Notts County in July 2014 until January 2015, during which time he scored four times during 20 appearances.

On 15 January 2015, he was loaned out for the rest of the season to League Two side Southend United. He won a play-off final promotion medal for Southend United.

On 23 June 2015, with effect from 1 July 2015, Jake signed a 2-year contract with a further 1 year option with Oldham Athletic.

On 31 August 2016, Cassidy had his contract mutually terminated by Oldham Athletic after 1 season at the club.

Cassidy then dropped into the National League, signing for Guiseley, where he scored eight goals in 34 games in the 2016–17 season. At the end of the season he joined Hartlepool United on a two-year deal. He scored 7 goals in 44 games for Pools, and had two loan spells with Maidstone United during his time in the North-East, where he scored 4 goals in 30 games. Cassidy joined Maidenhead United for the 2019–20 season.

Cassidy signed for League Two club Stevenage for a five-figure fee on 14 January 2020. He was released at the end of the season.

Cassidy signed for York City on 18 August 2020. He made 15 appearances for the Minstermen in the curtailed 2020-21 season, scoring one goal.

Cassidy joined National League North club Darlington in July 2021, and was one of six debutants in the starting eleven for their first match of the season, a 3–2 defeat at home to Alfreton Town. He opened the scoring in the next match two days later with the aid of an errant defensive clearance, but hosts Curzon Ashton came back to win 2–1. On 11 May 2022, Darlington announced that Cassidy was one of ten players released by the club.

On 27 May 2022, he signed for newly-relegated Northern Premier League Premier Division club Guiseley, returning to Nethermoor after five years away.

International career
Cassidy was capped by Wales at both under-19 and under-21 level. He scored once for the under-19s, against Scotland in September 2011.

Career statistics

References

External links

1993 births
Living people
Sportspeople from Conwy County Borough
Welsh footballers
Wales youth international footballers
Wales under-21 international footballers
Association football forwards
Airbus UK Broughton F.C. players
Llandudno Junction F.C. players
Wolverhampton Wanderers F.C. players
Tranmere Rovers F.C. players
Notts County F.C. players
Southend United F.C. players
Oldham Athletic A.F.C. players
Guiseley A.F.C. players
Hartlepool United F.C. players
Maidstone United F.C. players
Maidenhead United F.C. players
Stevenage F.C. players 
York City F.C. players
Darlington F.C. players
English Football League players
National League (English football) players
Northern Premier League players